Preston (also Pleasant Springs) is an unincorporated community in Kemper County, Mississippi. It lies at the intersection of State Highways 21 and 397 northwest of the city of De Kalb, the county seat of Kemper County. Its elevation is 541 feet (165 m).  It has a post office with the ZIP code 39354.

Notable people
 Michael Evans, member of the Mississippi House of Representatives
 Sampson Jackson, member of the Mississippi State Senate.

References

Unincorporated communities in Kemper County, Mississippi
Unincorporated communities in Mississippi